Turkish passports are issued in accordance with the Passport Act (No. 5682) from 15 July 1950 to Turkish citizens to travel abroad. Citizens of the de facto state of the Turkish Republic of Northern Cyprus (TRNC) are also eligible to apply for a Turkish passport.

Passports issued since 1 June 2010 are biometric and valid for up to 10 years.

Ranked in the Henley & Partners Passport Index, a Turkish Passport placed 54th in 2022.

Types
 Ordinary passport, after 2010 also referred to as Maroon Passport. It is issued to Turkish citizens who don't qualify for any of the following passport types.
 Special passport, also referred to as the Green Passport allows the bearer to travel visa-free to most European countries, some 67 countries, including but not limited to Ivory Coast, the Philippines and others. As opposed to the regular passport, it is exempt from the passport fee and is only subject to the booklet fee (₺501 (c. €25) as of 2023). It is issued to;
Former members of the National Assembly
First, Second or Third grade public servants.
Retired First, Second or Third grade public servants.
Non-metropolitan Mayors
Academics with at least 15 years of experience
The spouse of special passport holders
Unwed and unemployed children of special passport holders who live with their parents until they turn 25.
 Service passport, also referred to as the Grey Passport. It is issued to;
People who do not qualify for the Special or diplomatic passports, however, are assigned to travel abroad for official and/or government related purposes.
National athletes
Turkish citizens working for international organisations of which Turkey is a member
Staff members of the Turkish Red Crescent
Employees of the Turkish Aeronautical Association
Spouse of the service passport holders
Unwed and unemployed children of the service passport holders who live with parents, until they turn 25.
 Diplomatic passport, after 2010 also referred to as Black Passport. It is issued to;
Current and former members of the National Assembly, Ministers and vice presidents
Members of the Constitutional court, the head judges of the other judicial organs, and their deputies
Chief of the Turkish General Staff, his deputies, and four-star ranked generals and admirals
Former presidents, prime ministers, and speakers
Provincial governors and metropolitan mayors
Diplomats
Negotiators that are to deal with international issues
Spouse of the diplomatic passport holders. However, this passport can only be used when accompanying the primary passport holder.
Unwed and unemployed children younger than 18 years of age of the diplomatic passport holders who live with parents. However, this passport can only be used when accompanying the primary passport holder.

Biometric passports
Turkish Biometric passports, compatible with the new ICAO standards, have been available since 1 June 2010. Application appointments for the new passports can be reserved online through the government's website, applications must be lodged in person. Passports are then sent via mail.

The biometric passports have different coloured covers; regular passports in maroon and diplomatic passports in black, in compliance with ICAO standards.

New biometric passports, compatible with possible future EU visa waiver access, will start to be printed in 2018 made out of a polycarbonate material.

Fees
A Turkish passport has been one of the most expensive passports in the world for many years. As a result of increasing public demands, the cost of ordinary passports was almost halved in June 2010. Despite the massive reduction, the Turkish passport remains one of the most expensive passports in the world (after Lebanese (€293) and Australian (€198) passport -  for 10 years). The passport law was then amended to increase the maximum validity of a passport from 5 to 10 years. It currently costs ₺3796.50 (€189) for a 10-year passport, including the compulsory booklet fee.
 In addition to the expensive passport prices, the Turkish state charges ₺150 (c. €10) from Turkish passport holders (excluding ship and aircraft crew, those who live abroad and those with dual citizenship) every single time they leave Turkey.

Multiple passports
People who have valid reasons may be allowed to hold more than one passport booklet. This applies usually to people who travel frequently on business, and may need to have a passport booklet to travel on while the other is awaiting a visa for another country. Some Muslim-majority countries including Syria, Lebanon, Libya, Kuwait, Iran, Iraq, Pakistan, Saudi Arabia, Sudan, and Yemen do not issue visas to visitors if their passports bear a stamp or visa issued by Israel, as a result of the Israeli–Palestinian conflict. In that case, a person can apply for a second passport to avoid travel issues. Reasons and supporting documentation (such as a letter from an employer) must be provided.
One passport will have to be saved in a NVİ (provincial headquarters of the Ministry of the Interior, Civil Registration and Citizenship) or at embassy/consulate unless it awaits a visa for another country.

Turkish Passport by Investment
To be suitable for Turkish citizenship by investment program, the foreigner must open a bank account and deposit $500,000 or equivalent foreign currency or Turkish lira. After $400,000 or more is invested in Turkish properties, all necessary transactions such as title deed purchase and cash proceeds are carried out.

According to the law, the property transfer is concluded after the official signed bills and registrations.

Secondly, foreigners must apply for a residence permit. Although the applicants don’t have to be residing in the Republic of Turkey to get a Turkish passport, they are required to demand a residence permit, of which the results are given on the same day of application.

After receiving the residence permit, an applicant can apply for citizenship. It does not require an interview or to be physically present in Turkey. They can allow someone else or a company for their application management by giving power of attorney. The documents required during the application through the procuration process are the original title or an official copy of the title deed with a notary confirmation.

Visa requirements for Turkish citizens 

Holders of an ordinary Turkish passport may travel without a visa, or with a visa received upon arrival, to 110 countries, as of 2022 according to the Henley Passport Index. 

European Union is planning to introduce visa free travel for Turkish citizens.

United States lists Turkey as an aspiring country for inclusion to the Visa Waiver Program.

Gallery

Current passports

Historic passports
Listed chronologically:

See also
 Visa requirements for Turkish citizens
 Visa policy of Turkey
 Turkish identity card
 Turkish nationality law
 Turkish Identification Number
 Passports in Europe
 Passports of European Union candidate states
 Northern Cypriot passport
 Grey passport scandal

References

External links

Turkey
Passport